The 1951–52 NHL season was the 35th season of the National Hockey League. The Detroit Red Wings won the Stanley Cup by sweeping the Montreal Canadiens four games to none.

League business
A long standing feud between Boston president Weston Adams and general manager Art Ross ended on October 12, 1951, when Adams sold his stock in Boston Garden to Walter Brown.

The Chicago Black Hawks, who had made the mammoth nine player deal the previous season, now decided to make the largest cash deal for players to this time by paying $75,000 for Jim McFadden, George Gee, Jimmy Peters, Clare Martin, Clare Raglan and Max McNab.

The NHL and the Canadian Amateur Hockey Association (CAHA) agreed to a January 15 deadline for professional teams to call up players from the CAHA's Major Series of senior ice hockey. The agreement gave the NHL a source of emergency replacement players, and prevented teams in Canada from losing players during the Alexander Cup playoffs.

Rule changes
The league mandated that home teams would now wear a basic white uniform, while road teams will wear coloured uniforms. Before then, teams would often play with colored jerseys against each other, and with Television being in black white at the time, this helped viewers at home identify the two teams clearly.

The faceoff circles are expanded from a  radius to a  radius.

Regular season

Conn Smythe offered $10,000 for anyone who found Bill Barilko, missing since August 26. Barilko and Dr. Henry Hudson had left Rupert House on James Bay in the doctor's light plane for Timmins, Ontario, after a weekend fishing trip and had not been found.

For the fourth straight season, the Detroit Red Wings finished first overall in the National Hockey League.

Highlights
On November 25 in Chicago, Chicago goalie Harry Lumley hurt a knee. At age 46, trainer Moe Roberts, who played his first game in the NHL for Boston in 1925–26, played the third period in goal for Chicago and did not yield a goal. Roberts would stand as the oldest person to ever play an NHL game until Gordie Howe returned to the NHL at age 51 in 1979.

Chicago was not drawing well and so they decided to experiment with afternoon games. It worked, as the largest crowd of the season, 13,600 fans, showed up for a January 20 game in which Chicago lost to Toronto 3–1.

Elmer Lach night was held March 8 at the Forum in Montreal as the Canadiens tied Chicago 4–4. 14,452 fans were on hand to see Lach presented with a car, rowboat, TV set, deep-freeze chest, bedroom and dining room suites, a refrigerator and many other articles.

On the last night of the season, March 23, 1952, with nothing at stake at Madison Square Garden, 3,254 fans saw Chicago's Bill Mosienko score the fastest hat trick in NHL history, 3 goals in 21 seconds. Lorne Anderson was the goaltender who gave up the goals to Chicago. Gus Bodnar also set a record with the fastest three assists in NHL history as he assisted on all three goals Mosienko scored. Chicago beat the New York Rangers 7–6.

Final standings

Playoffs

Detroit finished 8–0, sweeping the defending Stanley Cup champions Toronto (the first time in NHL history the cup champs were swept in the first round) and Montreal, the first time a team had gone undefeated in the playoffs since the 1934–35 Montreal Maroons. The Wings scored 24 goals in the playoffs, compared to a combined five goals for their opponents. Detroit goaltender Terry Sawchuk never allowed a goal on home ice during the playoffs.

Playoff bracket

Semifinals

(1) Detroit Red Wings vs. (3) Toronto Maple Leafs

(2) Montreal Canadiens vs. (4) Boston Bruins

Stanley Cup Finals

Awards

Player statistics

Scoring leaders
Note: GP = Games played, G = Goals, A = Assists, PTS = Points, PIM = Penalties in minutes

Source: NHL

Leading goaltenders

Note: GP = Games played; Min = Minutes played; GA = Goals against; GAA = Goals against average; W = Wins; L = Losses; T = Ties; SO = Shutouts

Source: NHL

Coaches
Boston Bruins: Lynn Patrick
Chicago Black Hawks: Ebbie Goodfellow
Detroit Red Wings: Tommy Ivan
Montreal Canadiens: Dick Irvin
New York Rangers: Bill Cook
Toronto Maple Leafs: Joe Primeau

Debuts
The following is a list of players of note who played their first NHL game in 1951–52 (listed with their first team, asterisk(*) marks debut in playoffs):
Leo Labine, Boston Bruins
Real Chevrefils, Boston Bruins
Kenny Wharram, Chicago Black Hawks
Don Marshall, Montreal Canadiens
Dickie Moore, Montreal Canadiens
Wally Hergesheimer, New York Rangers
Eric Nesterenko, Toronto Maple Leafs
Leo Boivin, Toronto Maple Leafs

Last games
The following is a list of players of note that played their last game in the NHL in 1951–52 (listed with their last team):
Bobby Bauer, Boston Bruins
Roy Conacher, Chicago Black Hawks
Jack Stewart, Chicago Black Hawks
Bep Guidolin, Chicago Black Hawks
Turk Broda, Toronto Maple Leafs
Bill Juzda, Toronto Maple Leafs

See also 
 1951-52 NHL transactions
 List of Stanley Cup champions
 5th National Hockey League All-Star Game
 National Hockey League All-Star Game
 Ice hockey at the 1952 Winter Olympics
 1951 in sports
 1952 in sports

References

Sources

External links
 Hockey Database
 NHL.com

 
1951–52 in American ice hockey by league
1951–52 in Canadian ice hockey by league